Gordon Gordh (born 1945) is an American entomologist.

Biography
Gordh was born in 1945. In 1967, he received a bachelor's degree from the University of Colorado, and in 1972 his master's degree at the University of Kansas. Later on he got his Ph.D. from the University of California, Riverside in 1974. During the same year he accepted a position as a research entomologist at the United States Department of Agriculture. There he was working in Systematic Entomology Laboratory that was located at National Museum of Natural History in Washington, D.C., a work that he was doing till 1977. He studied parasites from a Hymenoptera family and from super-family Chalcidoidea.

Works
According to the Library of Congress, he wrote the following works:

References

American entomologists
1945 births
University of Colorado alumni
University of California, Riverside alumni
Living people